Cyrville is a station on the Confederation Line (Line 1) of Ottawa's O-Train light metro system, located at Cyrville Road (an arterial road serving several industrial areas) and near the Queensway.

History
Cyrville opened in 1990 as a Transitway infill station between St-Laurent and Blair. It closed on June 28, 2015 to make way for Confederation Line construction. It reopened on September 14, 2019, when Confederation Line service began.

Location
Retail stores near Cyrville station include the Desjardins credit union, Value Village and CANEX. This station serves very few riders but the adjacent empty lands may have development potential like the new condominium project by Richcraft Homes, Brownstones at Place des Gouverneurs, which has four condominium towers built just north of the station. Richcraft Homes has added four matching apartment buildings, making these some of the closest homes to the LRT line east of downtown Ottawa.

Layout
The station is an island platform station located at grade underneath the Cyrville Road overpass. Station entrances are located on either side of Cyrville Road; the northeastern entrance includes a ticket barrier, while the ticket barrier serving the southwestern entrance is located at platform level. Both accesses are wheelchair accessible as they are supplied with elevators. 

The station's artwork, Stand of Birch by Don Maynard, is a cluster of sculptures representing birch trees, located beyond the northeastern end of the station platform.

Gallery

Service

The following routes serve Cyrville as of October 6, 2019:

References

External links

OC Transpo station page
OC Transpo Area map

Confederation Line stations
2019 establishments in Ontario
Railway stations in Canada opened in 2019